The 2019 International Darts Open was the twelfth of thirteen PDC European Tour events on the 2019 PDC Pro Tour. The tournament took place at the SACHSENarena, Riesa, Germany, from 13–15 September 2019. It featured a field of 48 players and £140,000 in prize money, with £25,000 going to the winner.

Gerwyn Price was the defending champion after defeating Simon Whitlock 8–3 in the previous year's final, and he successfully defended his title, by defeating Rob Cross 8–6 in the final. It was his second Euro Tour title, while Cross failed to get over the line in his fourth consecutive European final.

Prize money
This is how the prize money is divided:

 Seeded players who lose in the second round do not receive this prize money on any Orders of Merit.

Qualification and format
The top 16 entrants from the PDC ProTour Order of Merit on 25 June will automatically qualify for the event and will be seeded in the second round.

The remaining 32 places will go to players from six qualifying events – 18 from the UK Tour Card Holder Qualifier (held on 2 August), six from the European Tour Card Holder Qualifier (held on 2 August), two from the West & South European Associate Member Qualifier (held on 12 September), four from the Host Nation Qualifier (held on 12 September), one from the Nordic & Baltic Qualifier (held on 24 August), and one from the East European Qualifier (held on 25 August).

From 2019, the Host Nation, Nordic & Baltic and East European Qualifiers will only be available to non-Tour Card holders. Any Tour Card holders from the applicable regions will have to play the main European Qualifier.

Michael van Gerwen and Dave Chisnall, who were set to be the 1st seed and 4th seed respectively, withdrew prior to the tournament. All seeds below Van Gerwen moved up a place and all seeds below Chisnall moved up two places. Jeffrey de Zwaan and Jamie Hughes became 15th seed and 16th seed respectively, and an extra two places were made available in the Host Nation Qualifier.

The following players will take part in the tournament:

Top 16
  Ian White (second round)
  Gerwyn Price (champion)
  Daryl Gurney (quarter-finals)
  Peter Wright (semi-finals)
  Adrian Lewis (quarter-finals)
  Krzysztof Ratajski (second round)
  Nathan Aspinall (quarter-finals)
  Joe Cullen (third round)
  Rob Cross (runner-up)
  Ricky Evans (third round)
  Glen Durrant (semi-finals)
  Jonny Clayton (third round)
  Mensur Suljović (third round)
  Steve Beaton (third round)
  Jeffrey de Zwaan (second round)
  Jamie Hughes (second round)

UK Qualifier
  Reece Robinson (first round)
  Brett Claydon (first round)
  Adam Hunt (first round)
  Joe Murnan (third round)
  John Henderson (second round)
  James Richardson (second round)
  Ritchie Edhouse (second round)
  Luke Woodhouse (second round)
  Kyle Anderson (second round)
  Arron Monk (first round)
  Mickey Mansell (first round)
  William O'Connor (second round)
  Steve West (third round)
  Justin Pipe (second round)
  Harry Ward (second round)
  Richard North (quarter-finals)
  Andy Boulton (first round)

European Qualifier
  Davy Van Baelen (second round)
  Danny Noppert (second round)
  Benito van de Pas (first round)
  Dimitri Van den Bergh (second round)
  Jelle Klaasen (first round)

West/South European Qualifier
  Davyd Venken (first round)
  Mike De Decker (first round)

Host Nation Qualifier
  Christian Jentschke (first round)
  Mike Poge (first round)
  Steffen Siepmann (second round)
  Ole Luckow (first round)
  Manfred Bilderl (first round)
  Michael Rosenauer (third round)

Nordic & Baltic Qualifier
  Daniel Larsson (first round)

East European Qualifier
  Boris Koltsov (first round)

Draw

References

2019 PDC Pro Tour
2019 PDC European Tour
2019 in German sport
September 2019 sports events in Germany